= Della Casa & Guadagni =

15th-century Florentine trading and banking company

- Company type: Trading and banking company
- Industry: Trade, banking
- Founded: 1450 in Geneva
- Founder: Antonio Della Casa, Simone Guadagni
- Headquarters: Geneva
- Products: Silk cloth, saffron, currency exchange, credit

Della Casa & Guadagni was a Florentine trading and banking company active at the Geneva fairs in the 15th century.

== History ==
Antonio Della Casa, son of messer Lodovico, and Simone Guadagni, son of Vieri, both descended from well-known Florentine families, formed a company at Geneva in 1450 that was present at the city's famous fairs until 1465. Directed without interruption by Guadagni, who became a citizen of Geneva in 1461, it underwent significant changes in the composition of the partnership and the structure of its capital.

The company was active in both trade—chiefly in silk cloth and saffron—and banking. It carried out major operations in currency exchange and credit through bills of exchange with Italian and other European cities. Between 1459 and 1464 its exchange business reached considerable proportions (700,000 to 800,000 écus and even more), far exceeding the strictly commercial side. Della Casa & Guadagni was thus among the six or seven Florentine companies that played a leading role at the Geneva fairs in the mid-15th century.

== Bibliography ==
- M. Cassandro, "Due famiglie di mercanti fiorentini: i Della Casa e i Guadagni", in Economia e Storia, 21, 1974, 289–329
- M. Cassandro, "Banca e commercio fiorentini alle fiere di Ginevra nel secolo XV", in RSH, 26, 1976, 567–611
- M. Cassandro, Il Libro giallo di Ginevra della compagnia fiorentina di Antonio della Casa e Simone Guadagni, 1453–1454, 1976
